Adatepe Olive Oil   Museum is a museum in Çanakkale Province, Turkey
It is located in an abandoned soap plant. It was opened in 2001 by a private olive company.

Turkey is one of the major olive producers of the World. The museum has been established to exhibit the tools about olive and olive oil. These include olive presses, harvesting and storage  equipment. Folkloric material around Adatepe is also exhibited.

References

Museums in Turkey
Buildings and structures in Çanakkale Province
Ayvacık District, Çanakkale
Olive oil
Agriculture museums in Turkey
Museums established in 2001
2001 establishments in Turkey
Food museums in Turkey